Basil Flynn (born 6 December 1955) is a former Australian rules footballer who played with Geelong in the Victorian Football League (VFL).

Flynn was 27 when he made his first appearances for Geelong, late in the 1983 VFL season. He played in rounds 17 to 19, then lost his place in the team when Peter Featherby returned from injury. His three other league games came in 1984. He won a Mathieson Medal in 1985 while playing for Newtown & Chilwell. His contributions in Newtown & Chilwell's 1985 and 1986 Geelong Football League premiership winning teams saw him named "Best player" in both grand finals. He was captain for the 1986 premiership.

References

1955 births
Australian rules footballers from Victoria (Australia)
Geelong Football Club players
Newtown & Chilwell Football Club players
Living people